Abdul-Rahman al-Tha'alibi (1384 CE/785 AH – 1479 CE/875 AH), was a Kabyle Scholar, Imam and Sufi wali. He was born near the town of Isser 86 km south east of Algiers. He was raised in a very spiritual environment with high Islamic values and ethics. He had great interpersonal skills and devoted his entire life in service of the most deprived, to dhikr of Allah, and to writing of over 100 books and treatises.

He has become a symbol of Algiers, which has become known as the "city of sidi Abder Rahman."

Birth and Lineage 
Abdul-Rahman al-Tha'alibi was born in the year 1384 CE/785 AH in Isser in modern-day Boumerdès Province into a pious family with a lineage going back to Ja'far ibn Abi Talib. His Kabyle tribe had long dominated several regions of Algeria from 1204 CE to 1515 CE. In 1378 CE, their nomadic dominance had been brooken up by Abu Hammu II, the Sultan of the Kingdom of Tlemcen.

Biography 
When 15 years old, Abdul-Rahman, with his father Mohamed Ben Makhlouf, went to Morocco for studies where he met the Muslim scholar Mohamed Ibn Marzoug Al Adrissi. In 1392, he made another trip to Bejaia (200 km east of Algiers) seeking knowledge where his father died. He stayed in Bejaia for 7 years studying Islamic sciences. There he learned from disciples of Abdurrahman El-Waghlissi (d. 1383 CE), such as Abû al-Husayn al-Mangalâtî.

Then 24 years old, he travelled to Tunis in 1406 where he stayed for eight years. He met the sheikhs Mohammed Ibn Khalf al-Ubay and Abû al-Mahdi al-Ghabrînî (d. 1413 CE) who introduced him to Sufism and tafsir.

He then traveled to Cairo in 1414 where he stayed with Walî Eddîn al-'Irâqî (d. 1422 CE). Then he traveled to Bursa in Turkey, where he was well received and a shrine was erected in his honour which remains an endowment for this saintly man.

He returned to Tunisia once again, where he always received a warm welcome. Here he wrote: "I noticed in those times, by the grace of God, there was no one in Tunisia who could be higher than me in the sciences of hadith ('ilm al-hadith). If I happened to speak, everyone listened to me attentively and accepted what I reported to them, out of modesty on their part and because they were people who knew how to recognize the truth. Some Moroccans once confessed to me: 'seeing you coming from the last of the East, by the grace of God, some saw in you the sign of tradition (ayat al-hadith).' And despite that, whenever I heard of an assembly where hadith were taught, I hastened to attend. May God make this act done only to satisfy Him, and may He keep us from vanity and ostentation."

From Tunisia at the age of 32, Abdul-Rahman went to perform Hajj to Mecca, ending his initial travels in search of knowledge. After the Hajj he returned to his native Algeria after 20 years. It is said that while walking the streets of the Casbah of Algiers, he heard a young man recite verse 34:15 of the Qur'an: "...Eat from the provisions of your Lord and be grateful to Him. A good land [have you], and a forgiving Lord." He said "this is a beautiful omen!" And he resolved to settle there permanently in Algiers for the rest of his life.

He was entrusted the title of Supreme Magistracy (qadi) by the authorities, but he preferred to abandon all honors and devote himself to asceticism and Sufism. He said "there are signs which show that if someone's love for the prophet of God is sincere, then it is necessary for them to give up the pleasures of this low world, to choose poverty, and to live it." He also said that one night he saw a dream of the prophet Muhammad standing and offering food to the poor. He gave a large part of it to Abd al-Rahman al-Tha'alibi and then said, "when the prophet gives food to someone, shouldn't he immediately vomit it up?" He replied, "should I vomit?" The prophet bowed down and said "this is not what I meant!" After this dream which left him perplexed, he came to understand its interpretation that he was simply commanded to "devote himself into initiating people into the path of God."

He taught in the Djamaa el Kebir mosque until he died on the Friday of 23rd of Ramadan 875 AH, the 15th of March 1479 after dedicating 95 years of his life to serve Islam and Muslims. His funeral was attended by many prominent scholars and political leaders, including Ahmad Zarruq and Ahmed Zouaoui. He was buried in Thaalibia Cemetery next to his sheikh Abi Djamaa Al Maknassi in the Casbah of Algiers.

Disciples 
Abdul-Rahman taught several murids and tolbas in Algiers, as:

Zawiya 

The zawiya contains his tomb, though it is a misnomer since it does not contain any Sufi order in the building. Currently the location houses the tombs of several Algerian historical figures. The first construction dates to 1611 CE and has gone through several changes and additions since, with little left of the original today. In 1696 Dey al-Hadj Ahmed al-Euldji decided to turn it into a funeral mosque. More tombs have been added over the years. Today the mausoleum is often visited by locals of Algiers, especially on Fridays and religious holidays.

Legacy 
He left a legacy of more than 100 books, among which the most important was Al Jawahir Al hassān fi Tafsir Al Koran (the fine pearls in the exegesis of the Koran).

In his lifetime (1384-1479 CE) the region was split into three states whose legal schools stood out: Tunis, Tlemcen and Fez. The city of Algiers offered little in comparison in terms of religious and cultural pull. It had very few religious schools for teaching the Qur'an, hadith, and legal texts. Economically it also waned in comparison to other cities in the region. Abd al-Rahman al-Tha'alibi's founding of the Tha'alibiyya school attracted many students from all over the world. Families moved into the surrounding area which turned into a place of religious education and training. From then on, Algiers became known as "The city of Sidi Abd al-Rahman."

He is not to be confused with Ahmad ibn Muhammad al-Thalabi.

Works 

His works cover nearly every aspect of the Islamic sciences.

Exegesis and Qur'anic sciences (al-tafsîr wa al-qirâ'ât) 

The brilliant jewels in the exegesis of the Koran ( al-Djawâhir al-hisân fî tafsîr al-qor'ân )
The stories of the Koran ( Nafâ'is al-murdjân fî qasas al-Qur'an )
The precious gold in the strange verses of the noble Koran ( al-Dhahab al-ibrîz fî gharîb al-qor'ân al-'azîz )
The chosen sources ( al-mukhtâr mina al-djawâmi ' )

Islamic Law (fiqh) 

The Book of Rites (Al-djâmi 'fi ahqâm el' ibadat )
The great compilation (al-Djâmi 'al-kabîr)
The Garden of Lights ( Rawdat al-anwâr )
The Garden of Lights and the Walk of the Righteous (Rawdat al-anwâr wa nuzhat al-akhyâr)
Commentary of Ibn Hadjeb's breviary (Charh mukhtassar IbnHadjeb)
Commentary of Ibn Khalîl's breviary (Charh mukhtasr sidi Khalil).
Commentary by Ibn Haroun (Char Ibn Haroun)
Commentary on the main questions of Mudawwana (Charh 'uyûn masâ'il al-mudawwana)

Hadith 

The selected sources  ( al-Mukhtâr mina al-djawâmi ')
The Forty Hadiths of Morality (al-Arba'în hadith fî al-wa'z)
Commentary on the wisdoms of Ibn Arafa (Charh ghurar ibn 'Arafa)

Sufism 

Truths about Sufism  ( Haqâ'iq fi al-tasawwuf )
The Gardens of the Pious  ( Ryyâd al-sâlihîn )
The gardens of the company in the science of subtleties and the journey of people of truth (Riyyâd al-uns fî 'ilm al-daqâ'iq wa siyar ahl al-haqâ'iq)
The direction of the traveler (Irchâd al-sâlik)

Theology (Aqida) 

The noble sciences in the states of the other world  ( al-'ulûm al-fâkhira fî al-nazar fî ahwâl al-âkhira )
The Book of Dreams  ( Kitâb al-marâ'î )

Morals (al-wa'z) 

The Direction for the Interest of the People (al-Irchâd limâ fîhi min masâlih al-'ibâd)
The compilation of wisdoms (Djâmi 'al fawâ'id).
The book of advice (Kitâb al-nasâ'ih)

Sira and History 

The lights in the signs and miracles   of the chosen Prophet ( al-anwâr fi ayât wa mu'djizât al-nabî al-mukhtâr )
The summary of the stories of the nations (Djâmi 'al himam fî akhbâr al-umam)
The journey to Allah (al-rihla ilâ Allah)

Arabic Language 

The embellishment of the brothers in the conjugation of verses from the Koran (Tuhfat al-ikhwân fî i'râb ây al-qor'ân).
The lexicon and its summary (al-fahrast wa mukhtasarihâ)

Prayers and litanies (Dua) 

The precious jewel (al-durr al-fâ'iq).
The very precious oath (al-'aqd al-nafîs)
The compilation of benefits (djâmi 'al-khayrât).

See also

 List of Sufis
 List of Ash'aris and Maturidis
 List of Muslim theologians
List of Algerians
List of people from Boumerdès Province
Algerian Islamic reference
Muftis in Algiers
Lists of mosques
List of mosques in Africa
List of mosques in Algeria

External links
French and Arabic resource on the scholar
Zawiya Sidi Abd al-Rahman

References 

Muftis of Algiers
Algerian Sufi saints
Asharism in Algeria
People from Isser
People from Isser District
People from Boumerdès Province
1384 births
Algerian people
1479 deaths
Deaths in Algeria
Arab scholars
14th-century Arabs
15th-century Arabs
Algerian Sufis
Algerian Maliki scholars
Asharis